Alfred Hermann Friedrich Vagts (December 1, 1892 in Basbeck – June 19, 1986 in Cambridge, MA) was a German poet and historian.

Vagts served in the First World War as a captain in the German military and was awarded the Iron Cross first class. In the years 1923-1932 Vagts was a historian at the Institut für auswärtige Politik (Institute for Foreign Affairs) at the Hamburg university. In this role Vagts visited the Yale university in the United States where he worked with American historian Charles A. Beard. In 1927 he married Beard's daughter, Miriam. Their son, Detlev, was born in 1929.

In 1932, with the rise of Nazism, the Vagts family left Germany for the UK. In 1933 they moved to the US, where Alfred became a US citizen. Initially he worked as an independent scholar. Between 1938 and 1939, he was a visiting professor at Harvard University before becoming a member of the Institute for Advanced Study at Princeton, where he remained until 1942. Then, until the end of WWII, Vagts served on the Board of Economic Warfare. After the war, and until his death, Vagts continued to work as an independent scholar

Vagts's work comprises scientific and literary books as well as essays. His most well known work is The History of Militarism, Civilian and Military. Vagts collaborated with Hajo Holborn, Eckhart Kehr, George W. Hallgarten, Fritz T. Epstein and Hans Rosenberg.

Bibliography
 The History Of Militarism, New York, 1937 online
 Beard, Charles A., and Alfred Vagts. "Currents of thought in Historiography." American Historical Review 42.3 (1937): 460–483. online
 "Hopes and Fears of an American-German War, 1870–1915 I." Political Science Quarterly 54.4 (1939): 514-535 online.
 Alfred Vagts and Caroline Farrar Ware, The Cultural Approach to History, 1940
 Hitler's Second Army, Washington, 1943
 Geography in War and Geopolitics, 1943
 Landing Operations: Strategy, Psychology, Tactics, Politics, from Antiquity to 1945, Harrisburg, 1946
 "The balance of power: Growth of an idea." World Politics: A Quarterly Journal of International Relations (1948): 82–101. online
 Defense and Diplomacy: The Soldier and the Conduct of Foreign Relations, London/New York, 1956
 The Military Attaché, Princeton UP, 1967 online

References

Further reading
 Rinke, Stefan H. "Clio in Exile: The Historiography of Alfred Vagts" Yearbook of German-American Studies (1991), Vol. 26, pp 267–281.

20th-century German historians
20th-century German poets
1892 births
1986 deaths
German male poets
20th-century American historians
American male non-fiction writers
German emigrants to the United States
German expatriates in the United Kingdom
People who emigrated to escape Nazism
20th-century German male writers
20th-century American male writers
German Army personnel of World War I